Saffordville is an unincorporated community in Chase County, Kansas, United States.  It is located about half way between Strong City and Emporia near the intersection of U.S. Route 50 highway and Zz Rd.

History
For millennia, the land now known as Kansas was inhabited by Native Americans.  In 1803, most of modern Kansas was secured by the United States as part of the Louisiana Purchase.  In 1854, the Kansas Territory was organized, then in 1861 Kansas became the 34th U.S. state.  In 1859, Chase County was founded.

In 1871, the Atchison, Topeka and Santa Fe Railway built a main line east–west through Safford. In 1996, it merged with Burlington Northern Railroad and renamed to the current BNSF Railway.  The Santa Fe depot building still exists, but has been closed for decades.  Most locals still refer to this railroad as the "Santa Fe". By 1921, Saffordville boasted a population of 200 hundred. It possessed several businesses including a blacksmith shop, automobile garage, restaurant, and barbershop, along with a bank and grocery store.

A post office was established in Safford on December 31, 1872.  The post office was renamed to Kenyon on October 27, 1887, then again to Saffordville on October 3, 1888.  The post office closed on January 6, 1957.

Numerous floods visited Saffordville, beginning in 1904, and then eight times between 1923 and 1929.  In June and July 1951, heavy rains flooded many rivers and streams in Kansas, including the Cottonwood River at Saffordville.  Many reservoirs and levees were built in Kansas as part of a response to the Great Flood of 1951. As a result of the 1951 flood, the town of 200 people was submerged under five feet of water. Residents were evacuated, and, when the waters receded, most of them relocated to drier parts. The town became a ghost town with little remaining other than two homes and the schoolhouse.

Geography
Saffordville is located in the Cottonwood Valley in the Flint Hills of the Great Plains.

Climate
The climate in this area is characterized by hot, humid summers and generally mild to cool winters.  According to the Köppen Climate Classification system, Saffordville has a humid subtropical climate, abbreviated "Cfa" on climate maps.

Education

The community is served by Chase County USD 284 public school district.  It has two schools.

Transportation
U.S. Route 50 highway passes near Saffordville, and BNSF Railway passes through it.

Notable people
 Fred Brickell, professional baseball player

References

Further reading

External links

 Saffordville history and photographs.
 Chase County maps: Current, Historic, KDOT

Unincorporated communities in Kansas
Unincorporated communities in Chase County, Kansas